The 2013–14 Penn State Lady Lions basketball team will represent Pennsylvania State University during the 2013–14 NCAA Division I women's basketball season. The Lady Lions, led by 7th year head coach Coquese Washington, play their home games at the Bryce Jordan Center and were members of the Big Ten Conference. They finished the season 24–8 overall, 13–3 in Big Ten play to share the Big Ten Regular Season title with Michigan State. They lost in the quarterfinals to Ohio State in the 2014 Big Ten Conference men's basketball tournament. They were invited to the 2014 NCAA Division I women's basketball tournament which they defeated Wichita State in the first round, Florida in the second round before being eliminated by Stanford in the sweet sixteen.

Roster

Schedule

|-
!colspan=9 | Exhibition

|-
!colspan=9| Regular Season

|-
!colspan=9 | 2014 Big Ten Conference women's tournament

|-
!colspan=9 | 2014 NCAA women's tournament

Source

Rankings

See also
2013–14 Penn State Nittany Lions basketball team

References

Penn State Lady Lions basketball seasons
Penn State
Penn State